Foretinib is an experimental drug candidate for the treatment of cancer.  It was discovered by Exelixis and is under development by GlaxoSmithKline.  About 10 Phase II clinical trials have been run.  it appears development has been discontinued.

Foretinib is an inhibitor of the kinase enzymes c-Met and vascular endothelial growth factor receptor 2 (VEGFR-2).

See also
c-Met inhibitors
Cabozantinib, a similar molecule and kinase inhibitor with FDA approval
VEGFR inhibitor
tyrosine-kinase inhibitor

References

Tyrosine kinase inhibitors
Quinolines
4-Morpholinyl compunds
Cyclopropanes
Fluoroarenes
Abandoned drugs